Dragan Paskaš (born 4 April 1951) is a retired Serbian military officer, who served as the Chief of the General Staff of the Armed Forces of Serbia and Montenegro from 23 December 2004 to 6 October 2005.

References

Chief of staff of the Military of Serbia and Montenegro
1951 births
Living people
People from Odžaci